Jesús María de la Villa Garcia (born June 30, 1958) is a Spanish chess grandmaster.  He won the Spanish Chess Championship twice, in 1985 and 1988.  He is a chess author and coach. In 2010 he was awarded the title of FIDE Senior Trainer.

Books

External links

1958 births
Living people
Chess grandmasters
Spanish chess players
Spanish chess writers
Chess coaches